Beauty Confidential: The No Preaching, No Lies, Advice-You'll-Actually-Use Guide to Looking Your Best is a 2007 beauty guide by American author Nadine Haobsh.

The author, a former beauty editor, provides tips and product suggestions in chapters broken down to cover beauty topics from head to toe.  Beauty Confidential is mentioned in an infomercial for Bare Escentuals Bare Minerals foundation.

The chapters
 Getting Started: What beauty editors know that you don't
 Hairstyling: Hairdressers that make love to your hair...and other adventures in styling
 Hair Color: Blondes don't necessarily have more fun, but salons sure as hell want you to think they do (Or: How a TV show changed my life)
 Eyes: Making the most of your sexiest feature
 Complexion: Who needs an MD?  Becoming your own dermatologist
 Sensitive Skin: Your skin is not Mike Tyson; please don't beat it up
 Face: Your skin is the palette and you are the artist—have fun with makeup
 Lips: Why should Angelina Jolie have all the fun?
 Body: Because your tummy and knees are part of your skin, too—pampering your body
 Bikini Line: We have all become strippers
 Manicure/Pedicure: If your nails don't look good, you don't look good
 Epilogue: The importance of beauty

External links 
Book Website*
Harper-Collins web page about Beauty Confidential
Author's beauty blog

2007 non-fiction books
American non-fiction books
Avon (publisher) books